Petrophila gratalis is a moth in the family Crambidae. It was described by Francis Walker in 1866. It is found in the Dominican Republic.

References

Petrophila
Moths described in 1866